29th Battalion may refer to:

 29th Battalion (Australia), a unit of the Australian Army raised for service during World War I
 2/29th Battalion (Australia), a unit of the Australian Army raised for service during World War II
 29th Battalion, (Vancouver), CEF, a unit of the Canadian Expeditionary Force raised for service during World War I
 29th Battalion (New Zealand), a unit of the New Zealand 3rd Division raised for service in the Pacific during World War II

See also
 29th Division (disambiguation)
 29th Brigade (disambiguation)
 29th Regiment (disambiguation)
 29 Squadron (disambiguation)